The threshold limit value (TLV) is believed to be a level to which a worker can be exposed per shift in the worktime without adverse effects. Strictly speaking, TLV is a reserved term of the American Conference of Governmental Industrial Hygienists (ACGIH). TLVs issued by the ACGIH are the most widely accepted occupational exposure limits both in the United States and most other countries.  However, it is sometimes loosely used to refer to other similar concepts used in occupational health and toxicology, such as acceptable daily intake (ADI) and tolerable daily intake (TDI). Concepts such as TLV, ADI, and TDI can be compared to the no-observed-adverse-effect level (NOAEL) in animal testing, but whereas a NOAEL can be established experimentally during a short period, TLV, ADI, and TDI apply to human beings over a lifetime and thus are harder to test empirically and are usually set at lower levels. TLVs, along with biological exposure indices (BEIs), are published annually by the ACGIH.

The TLV is an estimate based on the known toxicity in humans or animals of a given chemical substance, and the reliability and accuracy of the latest sampling and analytical methods. It is not a static definition since new research can often modify the risk assessment of substances and new laboratory or instrumental analysis methods can improve analytical detection limits. The TLV is a recommendation by ACGIH, with only a guideline status. As such, it should not be confused with exposure limits having a regulatory status, like those published and enforced by the Occupational Safety and Health Administration (OSHA). The OSHA regulatory exposure limits permissible exposure limits (PELs) published in 29CFR 1910.1000 Table Z1 are based on recommendations made by the ACGIH in 1968, although other exposure limits were adopted more recently. Many OSHA exposure limits are not considered by the industrial hygiene community to be sufficiently protective levels since the toxicological basis for most limits have not been updated since the 1960s. The National Institute for Occupational Safety and Health (NIOSH) publishes recommended exposure limits (RELs) which OSHA takes into consideration when promulgating new regulatory exposure limits.

Definitions of TLV 
The TLV for chemical substances is defined as a concentration in air, typically for inhalation or skin exposure. Its units are in parts per million (ppm) for gases and in milligrams per cubic meter (mg/m3) for particulates such as dust, smoke and mist. The basic formula for converting between ppm and mg/m3 for gases is ppm = (mg/m^3) * 24.45 / molecular weight. This formula is not applicable to airborne particles.

Three types of TLVs for chemical substances are defined:
 Threshold limit value − time-weighted average (TLV-TWA): average exposure on the basis of a 8h/day, 40h/week work schedule
 Threshold limit value − short-term exposure limit (TLV-STEL): A 15-minute TWA exposure that should not be exceeded at any time during a workday, even if the 8-hour TWA is within the TLV-TWA.
 Threshold limit value − ceiling limit (TLV-C): absolute exposure limit that should not be exceeded at any time

There are TLVs for physical agents as well as chemical substances. TLVs for physical agents include those for noise exposure, vibration, ionizing and non-ionizing radiation exposure and heat and cold stress.

Defining acceptable exposure
The TLV and most other occupational exposure limits are based on available toxicology and epidemiology data to protect nearly all workers over a working lifetime. Exposure assessments in occupational settings are most often performed by Occupational / Industrial Hygiene (OH/IH) professionals who gather "Basic Characterization" consisting of all relevant information and data related to workers, agents of concern, materials, equipment and available exposure controls. The exposure assessment is initiated by selecting the appropriate exposure limit averaging time and "decision statistic" for the agent.  Typically the statistic for deciding acceptable exposure is chosen to be the majority (90%, 95% or 99%) of all exposures to be below the selected occupational exposure limit. For retrospective exposure assessments performed in occupational environments, the "decision statistic" is typically a central tendency such as the mean or geometric mean or median for each worker or group of workers.  Methods for performing occupational exposure assessments can be found in "A Strategy for Assessing and Managing Occupational Exposures, Third Edition Edited by Joselito S. Ignacio and William H. Bullock".

Similar concepts

The TLV is equivalent in spirit to various occupational exposure limits developed by organizations around the world; however, the materials covered, values recommended, and definitions used can differ amongst organizations. These occupational exposure limits include:

United States 

WEEL (Workplace Environmental Exposure Level), formerly created by a committee of the American Industrial Hygiene Association; as of January 1, 2012, new WEELs are created by a committee of volunteers that is supported by the Occupational Alliance for Risk Science.

Other countries
Australia
OES Occupational exposure standard
Austria
TRK (Technische Richtkonzentration trans. Technical Approximate Concentration )
MAK (Maximale Arbeitsplatz-Konzentration trans. Maximum Workplace Concentration)
Brazil
LT (Limite de tolerância)
France
VME (Valeur Moyenne d'Exposition)
VLE (Valeur Limite d'Exposition)
Germany
AGW (Arbeitsplatzgrenzwert trans. Workplace Limit Value)
MAK (Maximale Arbeitsplatz-Konzentration trans. Maximum Workplace Concentration)
Indonesia
NAB (Nilai ambang batas)
Malaysia
PEL (Permissible exposure limit)
Netherlands
MAC (Maximaal Aanvaardbare Concentratie trans. Maximum Acceptable Concentration)
New Zealand
WES (Workplace Exposure Standards)
Poland
NDS (Najwyższe dopuszczalne stężenie)
Russia
ПДК (предельно допустимая концентрация)
Spain
VLA (Valor Límite Ambiental)
UK
WEL (Workplace Exposure Limit)
Ukrainian
ГДК (Гранично допустима концентрація)

Antonymic concepts
The opposite of "safe enough for any length of time" is "not safe for any length of time", and IDLH values are defined for concentrations of substances that are immediately dangerous to life or health.

See also 
 Exposure Assessment

References

Concentration indicators
Occupational safety and health

de:Arbeitsplatzgrenzwert
tr:Eşik sınır değeri